Frank Lamprecht (born 21 June 1968) is a German chess International Master and chess trainer.  He is a co-author of Fundamental Chess Endings (2001) and Secrets of Pawn Endings (2000), both with Karsten Müller.

He has been a chess trainer since 1983.

He gained the title of International Master in 1999. He has played in the Oberliga Nord for the Hamburg club King Knight SC since the 1984-85 season.

Lamprecht is known for his books on chess endgames, which he wrote together with Hamburg's Bundesliga player and Grandmaster Karsten Müller. Their book Fundamental Chess Endings won the Book of the Year award of the British Chess Federation.

Work
Karsten Müller and Frank Lamprecht: Secrets of Pawn Endings. Everyman Chess, London, 2000, . (Reprinted with corrections: Gambit, London 2008)
Karsten Müller and Frank Lamprecht: Fundamental Chess Endings. Gambit, London 2001, .
Karsten Müller and Frank Lamprecht: Grundlagen der Schachendspiele. Gambit, London 2003 (German language edition of Fundamental chess endings), .

External links

More than 200 games played by Lamprecht in 365Chess.com

1968 births
Living people
German chess players
German chess writers
Chess International Masters
Chess coaches
German male non-fiction writers